Matheus José Belém Souza (born 13 March 2003) is a Brazilian professional footballer who plays as a centre-back for São Paulo.

Career

Born in São Paulo, Belém joined São Paulo FC's youth setup at the age of 12. He played all 5 Copinha games and scored 1 goal for São Paulo's youth academy. After that, he was promoted to the first team. He made his professional debut with the club on 12 February 2023, coming on as a half-time substitute for Alan Franco in a 3–1 home win against Santos, for the 2023 Campeonato Paulista.

Style of play

Belem is known for his speed and physicality.

Career statistics

Club

Notes

References

External links
at ZeroZero.pt

2003 births
Living people
Association football defenders
Brazilian footballers
São Paulo FC players
Footballers from São Paulo